Serge Santucci (born in 1944 in Salernes) is a French sculptor and medallist. He is a student of Raymond Corbin, professor of sculpture and engraving medals at the National School of Fine Arts in Paris. In 1971, Santucci won the Grand Prix de sculpture artistique at the Casa de Velázquez in Madrid. In the 1970s he designed the UNESCO medal for Rubens Year.

References

20th-century French sculptors
French male sculptors
21st-century French sculptors
21st-century French male artists
1944 births
Living people
French medallists
People from Var (department)